The twelfth season of the American reality talent show The Voice premiered on February 27, 2017 on NBC. Adam Levine, Alicia Keys and Blake Shelton continued as coaches with Gwen Stefani returning after a two-season absence. Carson Daly continued as the show's host.

This is the first season iTunes bonuses were awarded for duet performances (seen in semifinals and finals), in addition to previous bonuses which were awarded during the live shows (including the finals which was intact since season 10).

Chris Blue was announced the winner on May 23, 2017, marking Keys' first and only win as a coach and the second female coach to win in the show's history, following Christina Aguilera. For the first time, the last artist (and also the first artist receiving only one chair turn by default) selected in the Blind Auditions went on to win the entire season.

Coaches and hosts

There was a change in the coaching panel for the twelfth season. Gwen Stefani returned to the panel after a two-season hiatus, replacing Miley Cyrus along with returning coaches Adam Levine, Blake Shelton, and Alicia Keys while Carson Daly returned for his 12th season as host.

This season's Battle advisors were: John Legend for Team Adam; Celine Dion for Team Gwen; DJ Khaled for Team Alicia; Luke Bryan for Team Blake.

Teams
 Color key

Blind auditions
Color key

Episode 1 (Feb. 27)
The coaches performed "Waterfalls" at the start of the show.

Episode 2 (Feb. 28)

Episode 3 (March 2)

Episode 4 (March 6)

Episode 5 (March 7)

Episode 6 (March 13)

Episode 7 (March 14)

Episode 8 (March 15)
This episode covered "The Best of the Blind Auditions", which included a recap and a sneak peek for the battles.

The Battles
The Battles round started with episode 9 and ended with episode 12 (broadcast on March 20, 21, 27, 28, 2017). Season twelve's advisors include: John Legend for Team Adam, Celine Dion for Team Gwen, DJ Khaled for Team Alicia and Luke Bryan for Team Blake. Like previous Battles, coaches can steal any two losing artists from another coach.

Color key:

The Knockouts
The Knockouts round started with episode 13 and ended with episode 15 (broadcast on April 3, 4, 10, 2017). The coaches can each steal one losing artist. The top 20 contestants will then move on to the "Live Shows." Unlike previous Knockouts, there are no key advisors in this round.

Color key:

Live shows
Color key:

Week 1: Live Playoffs (April 17 & 18)
Playoff results was voted on in real time, exclusively through Twitter and The Voice app. 12 artists sang live on one of two shows and six were eliminated by the end of each night. As with Seasons 9 & 10, each coach brought back one eliminated artist of their choice to join the top 20 and compete in the Live Playoffs. The Monday's performance featured Teams Alicia and Blake, followed by Teams Adam and Gwen on Tuesday.

Week 2: Top 12 (April 24 & 25)
The Top 12 performed on Monday, April 24, 2017, with the results following on Tuesday, April 25, 2017. For the next two weeks, the bottom two artists with the fewest votes performed for the Instant Save with one artist being eliminated. For the first time on The Voice, Shania Twain - who advised all the members of the Top 12 - sat in with the other coaches on a fifth chair. iTunes multiplier bonuses was awarded to Brennley Brown (#7).

Week 3: Top 11 (May 1 & 2)
The Top 11 performed on Monday, May 1, 2017, with the results following on Tuesday, May 2, 2017. iTunes multiplier bonuses were awarded to Lauren Duski (#3) and Hunter Plake (#10).

Week 4: Top 10 (May 8 & 9)
The Top 10 performed Monday, May 8, 2017, with the results following on Tuesday, May 9, 2017. This week featured a double elimination and the bottom three artists were to perform again for the Instant Save. iTunes bonus multiplier were awarded to Plake (#9) and Duski (#10).

Week 5: Semifinals (May 15 & 16)
The Top 8 performed on Monday, May 15, 2017, with the results following on Tuesday, May 16, 2017. For the first time, the duets between contestants were part of the competition and public voting, including the bonus awarded for that performance. In the semifinals, three artists would automatically move to next week's finale, the two artists with the fewest votes would be immediately eliminated and the middle three would contend for the remaining spot in the next week's finals via the Instant Save. iTunes bonus multipliers were awarded to Duski (#1), Chris Blue (#2), Aliyah Moulden (#7) and Plake (#10), and for the first time ever, a duet was awarded a bonus with performances for Vanessa Ferguson and Blue (#6).

With the eliminations of Brown and Plake, Stefani no longer has artists on her team.

Week 6: Finale (May 22 & 23)
The Top 4 performed on Monday, May 22, 2017, with the final results following on Tuesday, May 23, 2017. Finalists performed a solo cover song, a duet with their coach, and an original song. iTunes bonus multipliers were awarded to Duski (#1 and #2), Blue (#3 and #9), Jesse Larson (#5) and Moulden (#7). All iTunes votes received for the five weeks leading up to the finale were cumulatively added to online and app finale votes for each finalist.

Elimination chart

Overall

Color key
Artist's info

Result details

Team
Color key
Artist's info

Result details

Contestants who appeared on previous shows or seasons
 Anatalia Villaranda was a Top 51 auditionee from the fifteenth season of American Idol.
 Johnny Hayes was on the eleventh season of The Voice but received no chair turns.
 Brennley Brown was on the eleventh season of America's Got Talent but was eliminated in the Judge Cuts round.
 Micah Tryba appeared on the Sing it On YouTube / docu-series in 2015. The show featured collegiate a cappella groups competing for the International Championship of Collegiate a Cappella.
 Griffin Tucker who failed to turn a chair, auditioned for the sixteenth season of American Idol and was eliminated during Hollywood Week.
 Nick Townsend who failed to turn a chair, auditioned for the seventeenth season of American Idol and was eliminated during Showcase Week.
 Aliyah Moulden stars on the web series Chicken Girls as Luna.

Ratings

References

External links

iTunes Store
Google Play App Store	
App Official website

Season 12
2017 American television seasons